Aristotle's catfish (Silurus aristotelis) is a species of fish in the family Siluridae. It is endemic to Greece, where it occurs in the Acheloos River drainage.  Its natural habitat is freshwater lakes. It is threatened by habitat loss.  This species grows to a length of  TL and is of importance to local commercial fisheries. It is known from Lake Trichonida, Lake Lysimachia and Lake Amvrakia and introduced to Lake Volvi and Lake Ioannina in the 1980s thus exclusively lives in lakes. Threats may be water pollution and overfishing.

Its name derives from the fact that it was first described by Aristotle in his History of Animals.

References

Further reading
 Aristotle's catfish: explanation of its name

Silurus
Fish described in 1890
Catfish of Europe
Endemic fauna of Greece
Taxonomy articles created by Polbot